Daniel L. Glaser is a former Assistant Secretary for Terrorist Financing at the United States Department of the Treasury.  He served under Adam Szubin, the Under Secretary of the Treasury for Terrorism and Financial Intelligence in the Obama Administration.  His work came into prominence as the result of a 2010 WikiLeaks document dump.

Glaser received a B.A. from the University of Michigan and a J.D. from Columbia Law School. Previously, he worked at Coudert Brothers and held various positions in the George W. Bush administration.

References

External links 
An official biography
 Secretary Snow Names Daniel Glaser Deputy Assistant Secretary of Terrorist Financing and Financial Crimes
Congressional Testimony, November 8, 2005.
 Meet America's sanction cops, Money.cnn.com, retrieved November 10, 2012
 

Columbia Law School alumni
University of Michigan alumni
Living people
United States Department of the Treasury officials
Year of birth missing (living people)